Primate of Galicia and Lodomeria was the Catholic Church historical title of honor that existed in the Austrian Empire from 1817 until 1858 for the Roman Catholic Archdiocese of Lviv (1817–1848) and the Ruthenian Catholic Archeparchy of Lviv (1848–1858). Under this Primate were three ecclesiastical provinces of the different Catholic traditions: Armenian, Latin and Ruthenian (present day Ukrainian) in Halychyna.

History
The title was established without the consent of the Holy See on February 13, 1817 by the Austrian Emperor Francis I. The title was given to the Latin rite archbishops of Lviv. In 1848 Emperor Franz Joseph I transferred the title to the Greek Catholic Archbishops of Lviv. It ceased to be in use in 1858.

References

Catholic Church in Poland
Catholic Church in Ukraine
Lviv
Roman Catholic primates
Religious organizations established in 1817
1817 establishments in Europe
Religious organizations disestablished in 1858